The Grand Scheme of Things is a 1993 solo album by Yes guitarist Steve Howe. The album features seven vocal tracks and nine instrumental tracks using instruments including dobro, steel guitar, bass guitar, mandolin, keyboards, organ, Spanish guitar and anvil. The album reached No. 15 in the Billboard Top New Age Albums charts.

Track listing
All songs written by Steve Howe except where noted.
"The Grand Scheme of Things" – 5:09
"Desire Comes First" – 3:36
"Blinded by Science" – 3:28
"Beautiful Ideas" – 3:58
"The Valley of Rocks" – 3:07
"At the Gates of the New World" – 3:57
"Wayward Course" – 4:13
"Reaching the Point" (S. Howe, Keith West) – 3:52
"Common Ground" (Virgil Howe, S. Howe) – 2:15
"Luck of the Draw" – 1:40
"The Fall of Civilization" (Janet Howe, S. Howe, West) – 4:06
"Passing Phase" – 3:28
"Georgia's Theme" – 2:44
"Too Much is Taken and Not Enough Given" – 5:32
"Maiden Voyage" – 4:20
"Road to One's Self" – 2:38

Personnel
Musicians:
 Steve Howe – vocals, guitars (acoustic, electric, steel, pedal steel, bass), mandolin, koto, flute, keyboards, percussion
 Keith West – harmony vocals, harmonica
 Virgil Howe – keyboards, piano
 Anna Palm – violin, vocals
 Nick Beggs – bass, stick
 Dylan Howe – drums, percussion

Production personnel:
 Martyn Dean – photography, logo, cover art
 Roger Dean – artwork, design
 Richard Edwards – mixing
 Renny Hill – engineer, mixing
 Michael Jeffries – engineer, cabassa 
 Steve Rush – engineer 
 Paul Wright III  – engineer

References

External links
 

1993 albums
Steve Howe (musician) albums
Albums with cover art by Roger Dean (artist)
Relativity Records albums
Roadrunner Records albums